The Cuphead Show! is an  animated slapstick comedy streaming television series developed by Dave Wasson for Netflix, loosely based on the 2017 Canadian video game Cuphead by Studio MDHR. Chad and Jared Moldenhauer, the creators of Cuphead, serve as executive producers, along with Wasson and CJ Kettler from King Features Syndicate, and Cosmo Segurson serving as co-executive producer.

The series was released worldwide on February 18, 2022, and received generally positive reviews from critics, with praise for its animation, voice acting, music, humor, and tone, but some felt it lacked in substance, with the episodes' plots being criticized for being "too fragmented" and "often repetitive". The second season was released on August 19, 2022, followed, soon after, by the third season released on November 18, 2022.

Plot
Set in the 1930s-style world of the Inkwell Isles, The Cuphead Show! follows the misadventures of Cuphead and Mugman, a pair of anthropomorphic cup brothers who live with their elderly grandfather and caretaker, Elder Kettle, in a teapot-shaped cottage. The brothers' stories often center around them trying to find their way out of various issues, occasionally meeting and interacting with characters from its video game source material. While the series is mainly episodic, one recurring plot is the Devil hunting Cuphead for his soul, as he believes it is rightfully his after Cuphead lost a soul-harvesting game called "Soul Ball," only to be always foiled by Cuphead and Mugman.

Voice cast 
 Tru Valentino as Cuphead
 Frank Todaro as Mugman
 Grey DeLisle as Ms. Chalice
 Joe Hanna as Elder Kettle
 Cosmo Segurson as Porkrind and Elephant
 Wayne Brady as King Dice
 Luke Millington-Drake as the Devil
 Dave Wasson as Henchman and Telephone
 Chris Wylde as Ribby
 Rick Zieff as Croaks
 Andrew Morgado as Stickler
 Keith Ferguson as Bowlboy

Development 
In July 2019, it was announced that Netflix had green-lit the series. Chad and Jared Moldenhauer from Studio MDHR are executive producers, along with C.J. Kettler from King Features Syndicate, Dave Wasson, and co-executive produced by Cosmo Segurson. Clay Morrow and Adam Paloian are supervising directors. The series is animated by Lighthouse Studios, a Kilkenny-based division between Mercury Filmworks and Cartoon Saloon, and stop motion animation was provided by Screen Novelties. In an effort to meet streaming series deadlines, the show's production crew were unable to utilize hand-drawn animation like in the game, instead choosing to use puppet-based methods while also putting in various elements to match the 1930s rubber hose style. The series was first revealed at the Annecy International Animation Film Festival in June 2020, with the announcement that the show's music would be composed by Ego Plum.

Release
The first season was released on February 18, 2022, and consisted of twelve episodes. Netflix ordered a total of 36 episodes to be produced, that would end up getting released as three seasons. The second season was released on August 19, 2022, and consisted of thirteen episodes, with the third and eighth episodes being close to 25 minutes long. The third season was released on November 18, 2022, and consisted of eleven episodes, with the first, and the finale episodes being 20 minutes long, and the sixth episode being the longest episode in the series, lasting for 30 minutes long.

Episodes 
Every episode is written by Deeki Deke, Clay Morrow, Adam Paloian, Cosmo Segurson, and Dave Wasson.

Season 1 (2022)

Season 2 (2022)

Season 3 (2022)

Reception
On review aggregation website Rotten Tomatoes, 71% of 17 critics gave the first season a positive review, with an average rating of 7.4/10. The site's critical consensus is: "While The Cuphead Show! fluidly recreates its video game forebear's eye-popping animation, this good-looking vessel is still waiting for some substance to fill it." On Metacritic, it has a weighted average score of 69 based on reviews from 4 critics, indiciating "generally favorable reviews".

The Escapist noted that "fans and critics have been left disappointed by the series due to its lack of substance and short nature" but the target audience that is children and "kids will discover a bouncy and energetic cartoon and probably find what's here incredibly entertaining."

Rafael Motamayor of IGN rated the series 9 out of 10, saying "The Cuphead Show Season 1 delivers memorable characters, surreal humor, and beautiful animation in a fantastic adaptation of the video game."

Accolades
It was nominated for the 2022 Children's and Family Emmy Award for Outstanding Animated Series.

References

External links 
 
 
 Official trailer

2022 American television series debuts
2022 Canadian television series debuts
2020s American animated television series
2020s Canadian animated television series
American flash animated television series
Canadian flash animated television series
American children's animated adventure television series
American children's animated comedy television series
Animated series based on video games
Animated television series about brothers
Canadian children's animated adventure television series
Canadian children's animated comedy television series
English-language Netflix original programming
Fiction about the Devil
Film and television memes
Netflix children's programming
Television series about demons
Television series by Netflix Animation
Television series created by Dave Wasson
Children's and Family Emmy Award winners